The 2009–10 Guinness Premiership was the 23rd season of the top flight English domestic rugby union competition and the fifth and final one to be sponsored by Guinness. The reigning champions entering the season were Leicester Tigers, who had claimed their eighth title after defeating London Irish in the 2009 final. Leeds Carnege had been promoted as champions from the 2008–09 National Division One at the first attempt.

Summary
Leicester Tigers won their ninth title after defeating Saracens in the final at Twickenham having also topped the regular season table. Worcester Warriors were relegated on the last day of the season. It was the first time that Worcester have been relegated from the top flight since they first achieved promotion.

As usual, round 1 included the London Double Header at Twickenham, the sixth instance since its inception in 2004.

Teams
Twelve teams compete in the league – the top eleven teams from the previous season and Leeds Carnege who were promoted from the 2008–09 National Division One after a top flight absence of one year. They replaced Bristol Bears who were relegated after four years in the top flight.

Stadiums and locations

Table

Results

Round 1

Round 2

Round 3

Round 4

Round 5

Round 6

Round 7

Round 8

Round 9

Round 10

Round 11

Round 12

Round 13

Round 14

Round 15

Round 16

Round 17

Rearranged fixture

Round 18

Rearranged fixture

Round 19

Rearranged fixtures

Round 20

Rearranged fixture

Round 21

Round 22

Play-offs
As in previous seasons, the top four teams in the Premiership table, following the conclusion of the regular season, contest the play-off semi-finals in a 1st vs 4th and 2nd vs 3rd format, with the higher ranking team having home advantage. The two winners of the semi-finals then meet in the Premiership Final at Twickenham on 29 May 2010.

Bracket

Semi-finals

Final

Leading scorers
Note: Flags indicate national union as has been defined under WR eligibility rules. Players may hold more than one non-WR nationality.

Most points
Source:

Most tries
Source:

Season attendances

By club

Notes

References

External links
 Official site
 Match Attendance Figures

 
2009-10
 
England